Auditorio Metropolitano (originally Auditorio Siglo XXI) is an indoor amphitheatre located in Puebla, Mexico. It was designed by famed Mexican architect Pedro Ramírez Vázquez.

About
The venue was commissioned in 2001, with construction beginning in 2002. The music hall opened January 2005, as a part of the Centro de Convenciones Puebla William O. Jenkins. It was known for its facade made of talavera tiles. In 2014, the venue began a controversial renovation removing the tiles with tempered glass. These changes were protested by Vázquez's son. Renovations began September 2014. During this time, a contest was held to rename the concert venue. In December 2014, it was announced the name was changing to Auditorio Metropolitano.

Noted performers

Alejandra Guzmán
Alejandro Fernández
Andrés Calamaro
Backstreet Boys
Bryan Adams
Chicago
Daniel Boaventura
David Bisbal
Edith Márquez
Emmanuel
Enrique Iglesias
Fernando Delgadillo
Franco De Vita
Gloria Gaynor
Il Divo
Intocable
Jethro Tull
Juanes
Judas Priest
La Gusana Ciega
Los Tigres Del Norte
Luis Miguel
Manuel Mijares
Marco Antonio Solís
Margarita La Diosa de la Cumbia
Roberto Carlos
Santana
Sarah Brightman
Silvio Rodríguez
Wisin & Yandel

References 

Music venues in Mexico
Amphitheatres in Mexico
Buildings and structures in Puebla
2005 establishments in Mexico